Route 518, or Highway 518, may refer to:

Canada
Manitoba Provincial Road 518
 Ontario Highway 518

United Kingdom
 A518 road

United States
  Florida State Road 518
  County Road 518 (Pasco County, Florida)
  Louisiana Highway 518
  Maryland Route 518
  Montana Secondary Highway 518
  Nevada State Route 518
  County Route 518 (New Jersey)
  New Mexico State Road 518
  Ohio State Route 518
  Pennsylvania Route 518
  South Carolina Highway 518 (former)
  Farm to Market Road 518, Texas
  Texas State Highway Loop 518
  Virginia State Route 518 (1928)
  Washington State Route 518
Territories
  Puerto Rico Highway 518